Larbi Jabeur (born May 25, 1985 in Tunis) is a Tunisian football player who, as of 2009 is playing for CA Bizertin.

References

External links
 

1985 births
Living people
Tunisian footballers
Expatriate footballers in Libya
Tunisia international footballers
Tunisian expatriates in Libya
Al-Ittihad Club (Tripoli) players
Association football defenders
Espérance Sportive de Tunis players
CA Bizertin players
Libyan Premier League players